Recombinetics is a St. Paul, Minnesota-based bio-engineering company. The company was founded in 2008, and has since raised $31 million from private investors. Mark Platt is the CEO.

Products
It is known for developing genetically engineered hornless cattle, and is working on growing human organs and tissues in pigs. While it created a cow that does not grow horns, during the creation process it also added genes from bacteria that could produce antibiotic resistance. This occurred despite the CEO claiming that they had proof there were no other effects than the horns not being present. Due to the bacterial DNA, it is unlikely that the animals will get FDA approval, and a number of them have been killed and the bodies burned.

References 

Biotechnology companies of the United States
Technology companies established in 2008
Pharmaceutical companies of the United States